NASCAR Racing 3 is a racing simulator produced by Papyrus Design Group and published by Sierra Sports for Microsoft Windows in 1999.

Gameplay 
Players can compete in the 1999 NASCAR Winston Cup Series and the 1999 NASCAR Busch Series. The game's multiplayer was powered by the  Total Entertainment Network (TEN), but is now inaccessible by this method after the end of TEN servers in 2000. The game had an expansion called Craftsman Truck Series Expansion. Patches were available for updates for both the main and expansion games on the Sierra Entertainment website.

Reception 

NASCAR Racing 3 received favorable reviews according to the review aggregation website GameRankings.

According to Edge, the game sold at least 100,000 units in the US, but was beaten by NASCAR Racing 4s 260,000 sales in the region. Total US sales of NASCAR Racing computer games released in the 2000s reached 900,000 units by August 2006.

The game won GameSpots 1999 "Driving Game of the Year" award. The staff called it "as ambitious as driving games get". It was also a nominee for CNET Gamecenters "Best Racing Game" award, which went to Need for Speed: High Stakes.

References

External links 

1999 video games
Multiplayer and single-player video games
NASCAR video games
Papyrus Design Group games
Racing simulators
Racing video games
Sierra Entertainment games
Video games developed in the United States
Video games with expansion packs
Windows games
Windows-only games